Wearing underwear as outerwear is a fashion trend popularized by celebrities, sports and media. It began as a practical and comfortable variation of clothing, such as the T-shirt and the sleeveless shirt, but would later become fashion statements that would be controversial and accused of being provocative. 21st century versions include the display of thongs and bras in women's clothing, and the display of underpants under low-slung pants in men. Wearing underwear as outerwear has historical antecedents in the display of undergarments in the sixteenth and seventeenth centuries.

History 
It is unclear when this officially began as a fashion trend, however, Chanel unveiled womenswear made from jersey in the 1920s, a fabric that was usually used for undergarments. Notoriously, another notable edition was the invention of the T-shirt, which became popular outerwear after the Second World War. Short-sleeve shirts were originally intended to be a comfortable alternative to Victorian undergarments but teenagers began to wear them as outerwear, due in part to James Dean and Marlon Brando's characters frequently wearing them this way in the movies Rebel Without a Cause and the A Streetcar Named Desire respectively. Swimwear, such as the bikini, have a history in originally being used as underwear pre-Renaissance, and slip dresses were first widely worn in the 1990s, made from layered chiffon, polyester satins and charmeuse, and often trimmed with lace.

In entertainment, underwear-like outfits are often the uniform for wrestlers and circus performers; former DC Comics editor Julius Schwartz revealed that this was the reason why superheroes like Superman wore briefs on top of their tights. Madonna has been credited for making lingerie a popular outfit for female music artists on stage (e.g. Beyonce, Lady Gaga, Britney Spears, Katy Perry) when Jean-Paul Gaultier designed corsets ("an emblematic symbol of fashion in the early 90s"), a cone bra and girdle for her Blonde Ambition Tour costumes. Coloured and decorative nipple pasties have been worn by Cara Delevingne, Bella Hadid and Doja Cat as part of fashion outfits. For men, sagging is often credited to have begun from rap and hip hop artists in the 1990s, as well as skateboarders.

The sexual liberation movement of 1968 began the re-appropriation of the corset as a symbol of rebellion and "sexual perversity" by young women associated with London’s punk and Goth subcultures. This re-appropriation allowed a symbol historically associated with female oppression, to become reconceived as a symbol of sexual empowerment in fashion. Outside of underwear fetishism, the corset made an appearance in evening gowns and wedding dresses.

Sportswear 
The T-shirt would eventually become a part of sportswear fashion with unique designs from many fashion brands. Sports bras were first invented in 1975, and women have been wearing them under other clothing since then, but in 1999, Brandi Chastain scored the fifth kick in the penalty shootout to give the United States the win over China in the final game of the 1999 FIFA Women's World Cup Final, and she spontaneously whipped off her jersey in celebration, exposing her sports bra. Her act is regarded by some as a historical event that boosted the wearing sports bras on their own. From that point forward, sports bras have increasingly been worn as outerwear.

Cultural reception 

Society often portrays the public in underwear as surrealist and comedic: No Pants Day is an annual event held in various Western countries, where people publicly wear only underwear and leave their legs exposed. No Pants Subway Ride is a similar event to promote public wearing of underwear on subway trains. Another such event is Undie Run, where people run on the street wearing only their underwear.

The popularity of low-rise pants in the 21st century led to the unintentional trend of the "whale tail" among young women who aspired to wear something "rump-flattering", whereas sagging among young men and teenage boys became extremely controversial to the point of American towns demanding that it should be banned for indecency. However, the whale tail trend ended by the end of the 2000s and led to a rise in high-waisted clothing.

Menswear never experienced a similar fashion turnaround, and men who wore high-waisted were ridiculed for wearing "Dad jeans". Underwear companies took note on men's preference of wearing their trousers at the hips because low-rise pants sat lower than underwear and caused non-sagging men to expose their underpants waistband, so they exploited it through designing waistbands with bright colors and larger logos. Calvin Klein Underwear chief creative designer Bob Mazzoli explained in 2009, "Instead of a functional component, the waistband is a marketing platform and a canvas for real design [...] Seeing somebody with jeans that fall just below the waist to the point where the underwear shows is part of our cultural vernacular [and] it's something we consider in the design process." 2(x)ist's creative director Jason Scarlatti added: "It’s bragging rights for the customer. It says, ‘I paid good money for this.’" Jockey underwear, credited as one of the first underwear brands to print its logo on waistbands, unveiled an advertising campaign in 2013 that featured models holding up their shirts to show the Jockey waistband exposed above their jeans and shorts.

See also 

 Bikini in popular culture
 Bra § Undergarment as outerwear
 Bralessness
 Breastaurant
 Camel toe
 Fetish fashion
 Go Topless Day
 Indecent exposure
 Leotard
 Sagging
 Sexual objectification
 Social impact of thong underwear
 Swimsuit competition
 Upskirt
 Underwear fetishism
 Whale tail

References

External links 

 

1990s fashion
2000s fashion
2010s fashion
History of clothing (Western fashion)